The Hum Award for Best Writer Drama Serial is one of the Hum Awards of Merit presented annually by the Hum Television Network and Entertainment Channel (HTNEC). It is given in an honor of writers who has written best scripts (not based upon previously published material) and screenplay adaptations (usually a novel, play, short story, or TV show but sometimes another film) working in the television industry. Original and Adapted screenplays are jointly nominated in this category. The 1st Hum Awards (for 2012) was held in 2013, Umera Ahmed was the first winner of award for the screenplay adaptation of Maat from her novel of same name.

Since its inception, the award has been awarded to three writers, Umera Ahmed is the most nominated and awarded writer with five nominations, and two wins. As of 2015 year ceremony, Khalil-ur-Rehman Qamar is the most recent winner in this category for his original screenplay Sadqay Tumhare.

History
The Best Writer drama serial category originates with the 1st Hum Awards ceremony since 2013. This category has been given to the best writer/playwright drama serial of previous year to the ceremony held. The name of the category officially termed by the channel is:

 2012 → present: Hum Award for Best Writer Drama Serial

Winners and nominees 
In the list below, winners are listed first in the colored row, followed by the other nominees. The year shown is the one in which the drama serial first telecast; normally this is also the year before the ceremony at which the award is given; for example, a drama serial exhibited telecast during 2005 then this will be eligible for consideration for the 2005 Best Writer Drama Serial Hum Awards, awarded in 2006. The number of the ceremony (1st, 2nd, etc.) appears in parentheses after the awards year, linked to the article on that ceremony. Each individual entry shows the title followed by the drama serial, and the television writer. Since its inception the award have been given to both Original and Adapted screenplays.

As of the first ceremony, nine dramas were nominated for the award. All of the nine nominee were also included for Best Director category with additional one extra nominees which were not included in best writer drama serial category. Umera Ahmad and Faiza Iftikhar nominated twice in the same category for their works.

For the first ceremony, the eligibility period spanned full calendar years. For example, the 1st Hum Awards presented on April 28, 2013, to recognized dramas writer of dramas that were released between January, 2012, and December, 2012, the period of eligibility is the full previous calendar year from January 1 to December 31.  However, this rule was subjected to change when at third year ceremony two (Sadqay Tumhare and Digest Writer) of seven nominated drama serials were running on TV at the time when nominations were announced.

Date and the award ceremony shows that the 2010 is the period from 2010-2020 (10 years-decade), while the year above winners and nominees shows that the dramas year in which they were telecast, and the figure in bracket shows the ceremony number, for example; an award ceremony is held for the dramas of its previous year.

2010s

References

External links
Official websites
 Hum Awards official website
 Hum Television Network and Entertainment Channel (HTNEC)
 Hum's Channel at YouTube (run by the Hum Television Network and Entertainment Channel)
 Hum Awards at Facebook (run by the Hum Television Network and Entertainment Channel)]

Hum Award winners
Hum Awards